The Sotho-Tswana people are a meta-ethnicity of southern Africa and live predominantly in Botswana, South Africa and Lesotho. The group mainly consists of four clusters; Southern Sotho (Sotho), Northern Sotho (which consists of the Bapedi, the Balobedu and others), Lozi, and Tswana people. A fifth cluster is sometimes referred to as the Eastern Sotho, and consists of the Pulana, Makgolokwe/Bakholokoe the Pai and others.

The Sotho-Tswana people would have diversified into their current arrangement during the course of the 2nd millennium, but they retain a number of linguistic and cultural characteristics that distinguish them from other Bantu-speakers of southern Africa. These are features such as totemism, a pre-emptive right of men to marry their maternal cousins, and an architectural style characterized by a round hut with a conical thatch roof supported by wooden pillars on the outside. Other major distinguishing features included their dress of skin cloaks and a preference for dense and close settlements, as well as a tradition of large-scale building in stone.

The area now settled by the various Sotho-Tswana groups was reached by the Bantu expansion by about AD 500.  The standard theory asserts that the Sotho-Tswana are descended from a group that moved southward from the Great Lakes in a separate movement from the other Southern Bantu groups, proceeding along the western part of present-day Zimbabwe.

Ethnonym 
The Sotho-Tswana ethnic group derives its name from the people who belong to the various Sotho and Tswana clans that live in southern Africa. Historically, all members of the group were referred to as Sothos, the name is now exclusively applied to speakers of Southern Sotho who live mainly in Lesotho, and the Free State province in South Africa, while Northern Sotho, is reserved for Sotho speakers that inhabit northern South Africa, predominantly in Limpopo.

Sotho Ethnonym 
The Basotho name was derived from the word "sootho", "brown" , which means the ones with dark/brown melanin. "Ba sootho" directly translates to "They are brown".   

The usage of the word has always been part of the vocabulary of the Sotho-Tswana nation. The word became ascribed to a specific people due to regional conflicts: different bantu clans splitting from their ancestor clans and taking the name of their leader as their identity, but naturally in essence  every Batho/Bantu people is a mosotho.

Tswana Ethnonym 
The ethnonym Batswana is thought to be anantonym that comes from the meaning of the Sotho-Tswana word "tswa", which means "to come out of". The name would be derived from the word "Ba ba tswang" eventually shortened to the word Batswana meaning "The Separatists" or alternatively "the people who cannot hold together". One of the chief characteristics of the Sotho-Tswana clans is the tendency to break up and hive off.

Names
The term Tswana can be used to refer to one of the following 
	All the Tswana clans residing either in Botswana, Namibia, Zimbabwe or South Africa
	Any member of the Sotho-Tswana clans that trace their origin from Kgosi Mokgatle.
	Citizen of Botswana regardless of linguistic or ethnic origin
	Members of the eight major Sotho-Tswana clans as defined in the Chieftainship Act of Botswana.
	Members of the Sotho-Tswana clans that reside in Botswana, South Africa that speak a standardised dialect of the Sotho-Tswana called Setswana sometimes also referred to as the Western Sotho.
       Any Sotho-Tswana clan that inhabits the Kalahari Desert basin and its eastern and south-western peripheries, unless they are Kgalagari people, who are a different Sotho-Tswana group of tribes.
 
The term Basotho can be used to refer to the following
	Citizen of Lesotho regardless of linguistic or ethnic origin
	Any member of the Sotho-Tswana clans that trace their origin from Kgosi Mogale
	Members of the Sotho-Tswana clans that came together under the leadership of Moshoeshoe during the Difaqane.
	The Sotho-Tswana clans that stay in the Free State and Lesotho that speak a standardised dialect of the Sotho-Tswana language called Sesotho and sometimes referred to as the Southern Sotho

Classification

In Sotho-Tswana society each member has a totem which is usually an animal, totems are inherited from the father and thus pass like an English surname. The totem animal had traditionally a status of veneration and avoidance: in particular, it was important not to eat one's totem. In modern Sotho-Tswana society this is not as strictly observed.
Each morafe/sechaba had its own totem. When naming a clan the name of the founder could be used or the animal they venerate. An example is the Bahurutshe named after the founder Mohurutshe, or alternatively they can also be called Batshweneng after the tshwene (baboon) which they venerate, similarly Batlhako after the founder, or Batloung after the totem. For some clans the name of the founder and their totem are the same like the Bakwena and Bataung where the founders were named Kwena (crocodile) and Tau (lion) respectively.

The question of rank and seniority is one that is very important to the Sotho-Tswana. It determines a lot from family relationships, to village matters to relationships between clans and between the different tribal groups. In a family situation the issue of rank determines when a son will undergo initiation, or receive inheritance. A further distinction is also made between the senior wife and the junior wife if a man is in a polygamous marriage.

As the Sotho-Tswana lived in large villages, seniority and rank also played a part here, where the chief's homestead is situated at the centre of the village, thereafter the other citizen are grouped according to rank where the most junior members are living the furthest from the village centre. For inter and intra relationships between clans it has been a question that has occupied the Sotho-Tswana since the split that occurred between the followers of Mohurutshe and Kwena.  While it is generally accepted that the Hurutshe are the senior clan, some of the other clans have disputed this, mainly the Bafokeng, Barolong and Bakgatla. The claims of the Barolong and Bakgatla has mainly been dismissed as for an example some sub clans of Bakgatla like the Bakgatla ba ga Mmakau acknowledge the Bahurutshe as senior while the Bakagatla ba ga Kgafela do not. In the case of the Barolong, the Batlhaping who are an offshoot of the Barolong acknowledge the Bahurutshe to be senior to the Barolong, while the Barolong do not. The Bafokeng maintain that their split from core Sotho-Tswana body predated the split between Mohurutshe and Kwena, and therefore they are equal in status to the Bahurutshe if not senior.

These dispute over seniority and rank were driven by the quest for benefits and independence, a senior kgosi could demand a payment of tribute from a junior chief, they could also summon a junior chief or member of his clan to kgotla for a hearing. If a dispute arose between two junior chiefs the closet most senior chief to them would be invited to resolve it. Another important factor was that a senior chief or members of his clan could not be summoned to the Kgotla by a junior kgosi or clam member. An additional factor is this question of rank and seniority was that it was determined by birth and could not be changed, this means a chief born of minor status could not change his standing relative to the other chiefs. This was mainly to discourage the split up of clans into further sub-clans and to discourage the buildup of clans through conquest and warfare.

An important distinction needs to be made when discussing Sotho-Tswana clans is to distinguish between the different clans and the various sub-clans below them. This means distinguishing between clans sharing the same totem like the crocodile but are distinct such as the Bapo, Bakwena, Bangwaketse and Bafokeng of Phokeng. In distinguishing between sub clans an example are the Bakgatla who separated into the Bakgatla ba Kgafela and Bakgatla ba ga Mmakau over who should lead the clan. One faction defied the usual tradition of male leaders and acknowledged the female, Mmakau, as their kgosi. Those who supported Kgafela then broke away. Further offshoot from the Bakgatla are the Bakgatla ba Mmanaana, Bakgatla ba Mmakau and Bakgatla ba Motsha who all have the kgabo as their totem. The Bakgatla ba Mmakau would later give rise to Bapedi, Bakholokoe, Batlokwa, Baphuti and Basia clans If a dispute was to arise between any of the offshoot clans like the Basia and Baphiti then the Mmakau chief would be tasked with resolving it as their senior

Notable people 
Politics

 Moshoeshoe I – Founder of the Basotho nation
 Moshoeshoe II – Paramount Chief of Lesotho
 King Letsie – Reigning King of the Basotho
Queen 'Masenate Mohato Seeiso –  the queen consort of Lesotho
 Pakalitha Mosisili – Former Prime Minister of Lesotho
 Ace Magashule – Secretary General of the African National Congress, Former Premier of the Free State
 Tom Thabane – Former Prime Minister of Lesotho
 Ntsu Mokhehle – Former Prime Minister of Lesotho
 Leabua Jonathan – Former Prime Minister of Lesotho
 Mosiuoa Lekota – South African anti-apartheid activist, Member of Parliament. And the current President of the COPE
 Hlaudi Motsoeneng – South African radio personality and broadcasting executive
Kgalema Motlanthe – 3rd President of South Africa
Lesetja Kganyago – Governor of the South African Reserve Bank.
Edward Lekganyane – the Zion Christian Church (ZCC) leader
Engenas Lekganyane -the founder of Zion Christian Church (ZCC)
Sefako Makgatho – second President of the African National Congress, born in Ga-Mphahlele village
Malegapuru William Makgoba – Doctor
Thabo Makgoba – South African Anglican Archbishop of Cape Town
David Makhura – premier of Gauteng Province
Julius Malema – political leader. Former leader of the ANC Youth League. Commander in Chief of the Economic Freedom Fighters (EFF)
Mampuru II – King of the Pedi (1879 – 1883)
Richard Maponya – South African businessmen and founder and first president of the National African Federated Chamber of Commerce (NAFCOC). Born in Lenyeye, Tzaneen.
Cassel Mathale – third premier of Limpopo province
Lebo Mathosa – Musician
Kenneth Meshoe – politician
Peter Mokaba – former politician. Former leader of the ANC Youth League
Lydia Mokgokoloshi – actress
Sello Moloto – former premier of Limpopo province
Trott Moloto – Former South Africa National Soccer Coach
Mathole Motshekga- Politician
Aaron Motsoaledi – Minister of Health, South Africa and nephew of Elias Motsoaledi
Caroline Motsoaledi – South African political activist and wife of Elias Motsoaledi
Elias Motsoaledi – South African anti-apartheid activist and one of the eight men sentenced to life imprisonment at the Rivonia Trial
Es'kia Mphahlele – writer, educationist, artist, and activist.
Letlapa Mphahlele – former President of the Pan Africanist Congress (PAC).
Gift Ngoepe – the first black South African, and the sixth South African to sign a professional baseball contract when he signed in October 2008
Lilian Ngoyi – anti-apartheid activist.
Maite Nkoana-Mashabane – Minister of Rural Development and Land Reform, South Africa
Ngoako Ramatlhodi – first premier of Limpopo province
Gwen Ramokgopa – Deputy Minister of Health, former MEC of Health in Gauteng Province
Mamphela Ramphele – Former Director at World Bank. Former principal of the University of Cape Town.
Sello Rasethaba – businessman
Thabo Sefolosha – American basketball player. His father Patrick Sefolosha was a musician from South Africa.
King Matsebe Sekhukhune – son of King Sekwati. He fought two wars: first successfully in 1876 against the SAR and their Swazi allies, then unsuccessfully against the British and Swazi in 1879 during the Sekukuni Wars.

Entertainment
 Joshua Pulumo Mohapeloa – Music composer
 Lira – South African singer
 Mpho Koaho – Canadian-born actor of Sotho ancestry
 Terry Pheto – South African actress
 Sankomota – Lesotho Jazz band
 Kamo Mphela – South African dancer
 Fana Mokoena – South African actor and Member of Parliament for Economic Freedom Fighters
 Kabelo Mabalane – South African musician and 1/3 of Kwaito group Tkzee
Presley Chweneyagae – South African actor. He starred in the film Tsotsi, which won the Academy Award for Foreign Language Film 
Khuli Chana – South African hip hop artist
Caiphus Semenya – musician
Caster Semenya – athlete, Olympic Games medal winner
Judith Sephuma – Musician
King Monada – famous artist.
Master KG – famous artist and composer of the popular song Jerusalema.
Katlego Danke – South African actress
Connie Ferguson – Botswana born South African actress
Shona Ferguson – Botswana born South African businessman, actor, film producer and co-founder of Ferguson Films
DJ Fresh – Botswana born South African radio personality
Goapele – American singer with Setswana ancestry 
Thebe Kgositsile – American rapper, father is Keorapetse Kgositsile
Mpule Kwelagobe – Former Miss Universe 
Kagiso Lediga – South African stand-up comedian, actor and director
Gail Nkoane Mabalane – South African actress, model, media socialite, businesswoman and singer
Kabelo Mabalane – South African kwaito musician, songwriter and actor. He was a member of the kwaito trio TKZee
Maps Maponyane – South African television presenter, actor, fashion designer, speaker, model, voice over artist, philanthropist and entrepreneur
Bonang Matheba – South African media personality
Tim Modise – South African journalist, TV and radio presenter
Tumi Morake – South African comedian, actress, TV personality, and writer. Current presenter of "Dirage" on Motsweding Fm 
Cassper Nyovest – aka Refiloe Maele Phoolo, South African hip hop artist
Hip Hop Pantsula – South African artist
Manaka Ranaka – South African actress 
Dolly Rathebe – musician and actress
Rapulana Seiphemo – South African actor 
Tuks Senganga – aka Tumelo Kepadisa, Setswana rapper
Boity Thulo – South African actress 
Redi Tlhabi – Journalist, producer, author and radio presenter
Emma Wareus – Former Miss World First Princess
Zeus – aka Game Goabaone Bantsi, Botswana born Setswana rapper

Sport
 Khotso Mokoena – Athlete (Long jump)
Pitso Mosimane – South African football former player and coach – current manager of Al Ahly in the Egyptian Premier League 
 Molefi Ntseki – Former football coach for Bafana Bafana
 Steve Lekoelea – Former football player for Orlando Pirates
 Aaron Mokoena – Former football player for Jomo Cosmos, Blackburn Rovers, and Portsmouth FC
 Thabo Mooki – Former football player for Kaizer Chiefs and Bafana Bafana
 Abia Nale – Former football player for Kaizer Chiefs
 Lebohang Mokoena – Football player for Moroka Swallows
 Jacob Lekgetho – Former football player for Moroka Swallows
 Vincent Pule – Football player for Orlando Pirates
 Ben Motshwari – Football player for Orlando Pirates
 Lehlohonolo Seema – Retired footballer, Coach of Chippa United
 Lebohang Maboe – Football player for Mamelodi Sundowns
Reneilwe Letsholonyane – South African footballer
Itumeleng Khune – South African footballer
Victor Mpitsang – South African cricketer, fast bowler who has played for South Africa, currently cricket National Convenor of Selectors
Lucky Lekgwathi – Former South African footballer
Dikgang Mabalane – South African football player
Marks Maponyane –  retired South African football player
Amantle Montsho – Former world 800 metres champion
Kaizer Motaung – Former South African footballer and chairman of Kaizer Chiefs
Kaizer Motaung Junior – Former South African footballer
Katlego Mphela – South African footballer
Kagiso Rabada  – South African cricketer, debut for South Africa in November 2014 and by July 2018 he had topped both the ICC ODI bowler rankings and the ICC Test bowler rankings aged 22
Jimmy Tau – Former South African footballer
Percy Tau – South African footballer
Baboloki Thebe – Commonwealth 800 metres silver medalist. 4x4 Commonwealth gold medalist

Politics, royalty, activism, business and economics

Frances Baard – Organiser of the African National Congress (ANC) Women's League and Trade Unionist 
Bathoen I – Former Kgosi (paramount chief) of the Ngwaketse
Manne Dipico – first premier of Northern Cape province, South Africa
Winkie Direko – former premier of Free State and former chancellor of University of Free State
Unity Dow – Botswana former High Court judge, author, activist, Minister
John Taolo Gaetsewe – Trade unionist, member of the ANC and General Secretary of SACTU, Robben Island prisoner, banned person
Khama III – King of Botswana 
Ian Khama – Fourth President of Botswana
Seretse Khama – First President of Botswana
Moses Kotane – South African politician and activist
David Magang – Botswana lawyer, businessman and politician
Supra Mahumapelo – South African politician
Mmusi Maimane – South African politician
Toto Makgolokwe – Paramount chief (kgosi) of the Batlharo tribe of South Africa
Lucas Mangope – Former President of Bophutatswana
Quett Masire – Second President of Botswana
Mokgweetsi Masisi – President of Botswana
Joe Matthews – South African politician
Naledi Pandor (née Matthews) – South African politician and minister
Festus Mogae – Third President of Botswana
Mogoeng Mogoeng – Chief Justice, South Africa
Job Mokgoro – South African politician and academic
Yvonne Mokgoro – Former South African Constitutional Court Justice
Brian Molefe – South African businessman, appointed CEO of Transnet in February 2011, and CEO of Eskom in April 2015
Popo Molefe – first premier of North West province, South Africa
Dipuo Peters – South Africa politician, former Minister of Transport and Minister of Energy from 2009 to 2013
Edna Molewa – South African politician
Leruo Molotlegi – King of the Royal Bafokeng Nation
Ruth Mompati – South African political activist
James Moroka – one of the ANC Presidents (1949 to 1952)
Dikgang Moseneke – South African judge and former Deputy Chief Justice of South Africa
Nthato Motlana – Prominent South African businessman, physician and anti-apartheid activist
Bridgette Motsepe – South African businesswoman
Patrice Motsepe – South African billionaire mining businessman
Tshepo Motsepe – First Lady of South Africa as the wife of Cyril Ramaphosa, the President of South Africa
Sebele I – Former Chief (Kgosi) of the Kwena – a major Tswana tribe (morafe) in modern-day Botswana
Molefi Sefularo – South African politician
Abram Onkgopotse Tiro – South African student activist and black consciousness militant

See also 
 Tswana people
 Sotho people
 Pedi people
 Barotseland
 Lozi people

References

http://www.namibian.org/travel/namibia/population/tswana.htm
 

http://mphebathomuseum.org.za/?q=node/42